Kevin Harrington (born October 15, 1956) is an American entrepreneur and business executive. He has appeared on the television series Shark Tank.

Career
In 1985 he created his first infomercial after identifying an opportunity to fill late night and early morning dead air time on cable networks.  While companies like Vitamix had been producing infomercial programs for TV broadcasters since 1949, Harrington's model of replacing time that the broadcaster was normally off the air with entertaining and informative advertising launched the modern infomercial format.  As President of National Media he oversaw the launch of several successful infomercials himself. 

After leaving National Media in 1994, he formed a "joint venture company with The Home Shopping Network" and "co-founded HSN Direct International Inc. and served as its Chief Executive Officer (CEO) and President" between 1994 and 1998.  In 2002, he became the President of Harrington Business Development Inc. and the Chairman of On TV, Inc. That same year, he became the Vice Chairman and Director of Thane International Inc. and the Director of Reliant International Inc., leaving both positions in 2003. 

In 2004, Harrington became the Chairman of Reliant Interactive Media Corp. and the CEO of ResponzeTV America, LLC.

Harrington was the Director of Infusion Brands International, Inc. from 2006 to 2008. In 2007, he became the Chief Executive Officer of ResponzeTV Plc and the Executive Director of ResponzeTV Plc, leaving both positions in 2008. Harrington was one of the original panel members and investors ("Sharks") on the ABC TV series Shark Tank from its inception in 2009. He left in 2011 after two seasons on the show.

Other works 
Harrington published his book, Act Now: How I Turn Ideas into Million-Dollar Products in 2009. In 2010, Harrington became a Member of Advisory Board at AbsolutelyNew, Inc. and the Chairman and Senior Executive Officer of H & H Imports Inc. In 2013, he teamed with Cherif Medawar through efreedom.com and together they laid out a plan to equip up-and-coming innovators and business owners with the tools and methods to become Sharks themselves. 

He served as CEO of the Internet company TVGoods and Senior Executive Officer and Chairman of the Board of Directors for the company called As Seen On TV, Inc. Harrington has been the Director of Harrington Business Development Inc., since 2002. He is an ex officio of the Electronic Retailing Association (ERA), Founders Circle. Kevin Harrington became the company spokesperson for InventHelp in April 2013.

Bibliography 
 Act Now: How I Turn Ideas into Million-Dollar Products (HCI, 2009) 
 Key Person of Influence: The Five-Step Method to Become One of the Most Highly Valued and Highly Paid People in Your Industry (Rethink Press Limited, 2015) 
 Put a Shark in Your Tank: Actionable Steps to Business Success (CreateSpace Independent Publishing Platform, 2017) 
 The Secrets of Closing the Sale Masterclass inspired by the teaching of Zig Ziglar.

References

External links
 

1956 births
Living people
American investors
Participants in American reality television series
Businesspeople from Cincinnati
20th-century American businesspeople
21st-century American businesspeople